Costa Rica competed at the 2014 Summer Youth Olympics, in Nanjing, China from 16 August to 28 August 2014.

Judo

Costa Rica qualified one athlete based on its performance at the 2013 Cadet World Judo Championships.

Individual

Team

Swimming

Costa Rica qualified one swimmer.

Boys

Triathlon

Costa Rica was given a quota to compete by the tripartite committee.

Individual

Relay

References

2014 in Costa Rican sport
Nations at the 2014 Summer Youth Olympics
Costa Rica at the Youth Olympics